Adam Davies may refer to:

Adam Davies (footballer, born 1987), Welsh football full-back
Adam Davies (footballer, born 1992), Wales international football goalkeeper
Adam Davies (cricketer) (born 1980), Welsh cricketer
Adam Davies (author), American author
Adam Davies (snooker player) (born 1987), British snooker player

See also
Adam Davis (disambiguation)